Clear Lake is a lake in Marshall County, South Dakota, in the United States.

Clear Lake was descriptively named for its clear water.

The Clear Lake census-designated place comprises the residences and businesses which surround the lake.

See also
List of lakes in South Dakota

References

Lakes of South Dakota
Lakes of Marshall County, South Dakota